Guillaume de Morlaye (c.1510–c.1558) was a French Renaissance era lutenist, composer and music publisher. He was a pupil of Albert de Rippe and lived and worked in Paris. In 1552 he received a ten-year license to publish music from Henry II, and between 1553 and 1558 published four lute collections in cooperation with Michel Fezandat and six lute collections compiled by Albert de Rippe. He also published three books of his own four-course Renaissance guitar compositions during 1552–53, including fantasies and dances, and also lute arrangements of Pierre Certon and Claudin de Sermisy.

References

External links
Partial discography

1500s births
1500s deaths
16th-century classical composers
French classical composers
French male classical composers
French music publishers (people)
French lutenists
Musicians from Paris
Renaissance composers